2,3-Butylene carbonate, a chemical substance, may refer to:

 cis-2,3-Butylene carbonate
 trans-2,3-Butylene carbonate